ATLANTIS-2 is a fiber optic transatlantic telecommunications cable connecting Argentina, Brazil, Senegal, Cape Verde, Spain's Canary Islands and Portugal. It is the first submarine cable to link South America and the African continent.

The Atlantis 2 project total cost was  US$370 million invest by a 25 international carrier consortium led technically and financially by Embratel with more than US$100  million of the investment.

Embratel, which organized the project, also installed two additional fiber pairs of 40Gbit/s for its exclusive use between Fortaleza and Rio de Janeiro.

The cable was ready for service in February 2000 with a launch capacity of 40Gbit/s. On May 10, to celebrate the definitive start-up of that operation, a videoconference between Fernando Henrique Cardoso (President of Brazil) and António Guterres (Prime Minister of Portugal) was held to demonstrate the new link.

It is approximately 12,000 kilometers in length.
Cable is Disconnected 10 January 2022, consortium decision
It can already be upgraded with current technology to 160Gbit/s

The landing points include:

 Las Toninas, Argentina
 Fortaleza, Brazil
 Praia, Cape Verde
 Dakar, Senegal
 El Médano, Canary Islands, Spain
 Lisbon, Portugal

Sources

References

See also 
List of international submarine communications cables

Individual cable systems off the west coast of Africa include:
 ACE
 GLO-1
 Main One
 SAT-2
 SAT-3/WASC
 WACS

 Transatlantic communications cables
Submarine communications cables in the North Atlantic Ocean
Submarine communications cables in the South Atlantic Ocean
Infrastructure completed in 2000
2000 establishments in Argentina
2000 establishments in Brazil
2000 establishments in Cape Verde
2000 establishments in Portugal
2000 establishments in Spain